Old Bridge Township is a township in Middlesex County, in the U.S. state of New Jersey, located in the Raritan Valley region and within the New York metropolitan area. As of the 2020 United States census, the township was the state's 21st-most-populous municipality, with a population of 66,876, an increase of 1,501 (+2.3%) from the 2010 census count of 65,375, which in turn reflected an increase of 4,919 (+8.1%) from the 60,456 counted at the 2000 census. As of the 2010 Census, the township was ranked 18th in the state by population, after being the state's 21st most-populous municipality in 2000.

What is now Old Bridge Township was originally incorporated as Madison Township by an act of the New Jersey Legislature on March 2, 1869, from portions of South Amboy Township (now City of South Amboy). In a referendum held on November 5, 1975, voters approved changing the township's name to Old Bridge Township by a margin of 7,150 votes to 4,888. The township's name was changed to avoid confusion with the borough of Madison in Morris County. After the township was established, the area was made up primarily of farms and the population grew slowly. In 1880, the population was 1,662 and in 1950 it had reached 7,365. Over the next decade, a building boom started and farms gave way to developments, and the population grew to 22,772 by 1960. The 1980 census cited 51,406 people. The township saw major changes with the extension of Route 18 to the shore.

The township was named as a contender for the title of one of the best places to live in the United States by Money magazine in both 2005 and 2007.

In 2016, SafeWise named Old Bridge Township as the sixth-safest city in America to raise a child; the township was the second-highest ranked of the 12 communities in New Jersey included on the list.

History 
The first inhabitants of the area known as Old Bridge were the Lenni Lenape Native Americans. Those who settled in Old Bridge were known as the Unami, or "people down the river." They migrated to the shore along the Raritan each summer from their hunting grounds in the north. When the English gained control from the Dutch in 1664, the state was divided into two provinces, East Jersey and West Jersey. In 1683, the general assembly of East Jersey defined the boundaries of Middlesex County and the three other original counties (Bergen, Essex and Monmouth) as containing all plantations on both sides of the Raritan River, as far as Cheesequake Harbor to the east, then southwest to the Provincial line, with the southwest line being the border of Monmouth and Middlesex counties and the Township's southern border.

Thomas Warne, one of the original 24 proprietors of East Jersey, was listed as a landowner of this area, and his son is said to have been the earliest European resident residing in the Cheesequake area in 1683.  John and Susannah Brown were granted a  land grant from the King of England in 1737.  They called the area Brownville, and today this part of town is now known as Browntown.

In 1684, South Amboy Township was formed. At that time, it covered an area that now consists of the Townships of Monroe and Old Bridge, the Borough of Sayreville and the City of South Amboy. The Township covers  that separated from South Amboy on March 2, 1869, and was originally called Madison Township. In 1975, the name was changed by referendum to the Township of Old Bridge. The purpose was to establish a single postal designation and ZIP code for the township and to differentiate the township from the Borough of Madison in Morris County. The community of Old Bridge in East Brunswick derives its name from the fact that the first bridge spanning the South River was built there, and as other bridges were built across the river the first one became known as "the Old Bridge."

Geography
According to the United States Census Bureau, the township had a total area of 40.93 square miles (106.00 km2), including 38.18 square miles (98.89 km2) of land and 2.75 square miles (7.11 km2) of water (6.71%).

Brownville (2010 population of 2,383), Laurence Harbor (2010 population of 6,536), Madison Park (2010 population of 7,144) and Old Bridge CDP (2010 population of 23,753) are unincorporated communities and census-designated places (CDPs) located within Old Bridge Township. Other unincorporated communities, localities and place names within Old Bridge Township include Browntown, Brunswick Gardens, Cheesequake, Cottrell Corners, Matchaponix, Moerls Corner, Morristown, Parlin, Redshaw Corner, Runyon, Sayre Woods South, South Old Bridge and Texas.

Old Bridge Township borders the municipalities of East Brunswick, Monroe Township, Sayreville and Spotswood in Middlesex County; Aberdeen Township, Manalapan Township, Marlboro Township and Matawan in Monmouth County; and shares a border with the borough of Staten Island in New York City, across Raritan Bay.

Major streams/rivers
 Raritan Bay
 South River
 Matchaponix Brook
 Deep Run
 Tennets Brook
 Barclay Brook
 Cheesequake Creek

Demographics

2010 census

The Census Bureau's 2006–2010 American Community Survey showed that (in 2010 inflation-adjusted dollars) median household income was $82,640 (with a margin of error of +/− $6,053) and the median family income was $98,634 (+/− $2,857). Males had a median income of $67,487 (+/− $3,364) versus $48,856 (+/− $3,104) for females. The per capita income for the township was $35,666 (+/− $1,152). About 3.1% of families and 4.1% of the population were below the poverty line, including 4.3% of those under age 18 and 6.6% of those age 65 or over.

2000 census
As of the 2000 United States census there were 60,456 people, 21,438 households, and 15,949 families residing in the township.  The population density was 1,587.4 people per square mile (612.8/km2).  There were 21,896 housing units at an average density of 574.9 per square mile (222.0/km2).  The racial makeup of the township was 79.48% White, 10.82% Asian, 5.30% African American, 0.16% Native American, 0.04% Pacific Islander, 1.87% from other races and 2.32% from two or more races. 7.57% of the population were Hispanic or Latino of any race.

There were 21,438 households, out of which 37.8% had children under the age of 18 living with them, 61.2% were married couples living together, 9.5% had a female householder with no husband present, and 25.6% were non-families. 21.1% of all households were made up of individuals, and 6.8% had someone living alone who was 65 years of age or older.  The average household size was 2.80 and the average family size was 3.30.

In the township the population was spread out, with 25.9% under the age of 18, 7.0% from 18 to 24, 33.6% from 25 to 44, 22.9% from 45 to 64, and 10.5% who were 65 years of age or older.  The median age was 36 years. For every 100 females, there were 95.6 males.  For every 100 females age 18 and over, there were 91.7 males.

The median income for a household in the township was $64,707, and the median income for a family was $74,045. Males had a median income of $51,978 versus $35,462 for females. The per capita income for the township was $26,814.  About 3.0% of families and 4.2% of the population were below the poverty line, including 5.0% of those under age 18 and 7.2% of those age 65 or over.

Economy

Old mill streams
Madison Township had many mill streams that were used to generate water power.  The Warne family owned fulling mills in the area.  Fulling was used as a finishing process used on woolen cloth that would remove the dirt and grease and to compact the wool fibers.  The mill is said to have been run behind Old Bridge High School and flows east into the Matawan Creek.  The area of Old Bridge was also known for its many mills that manufactured snuff, a scented tobacco product that was used by men and women during that time. The Washington Snuff mill (later renamed the Dill Snuff Mill) was established in 1801 and was located on Mount Pleasant and Old Bridge Turnpike (now Route 516).

Clay industry
The clay soil in the area surrounding Old Bridge was used for pottery and bricks way before the first European settlers.  "Fine clay had surrounded Cheesequake Creek when the Lenni Lenape Native Americans lived there.  The early discoveries of clay along the banks opened the clay industry to Middlesex County as well as the state of New Jersey.  By the 1800s clay was a major industry.  The clay deposits found along Cheesequake Creek are reported to be some of the finest stoneware clays in the United States."  The clay supplied local potters as well as those in Hudson Valley, Norwalk, Connecticut, other New England states, and parts of Canada.  The earliest use of clay from this area was used by Captain James Morgan before the Revolution.  The Perrine clay pit was located near U.S. Route 9 and Ernston Road.

Apple farms
The Cottrell homestead is a landmark in Old Bridge. It was built in 1831 and still stands today on the northeast corner of County Route 516 and Cottrell Road. The Cottrells owned a  apple orchard that was located across the street from their home. Apples that could not be used because of their size or quality did not go to waste. Across from the cold-storage building on the southwest corner of Cottrell Road and Route 516 (where Walgreens is now located), the family built the New Jersey Apple Growers Inc. distillery. It was at this distillery that they pressed the apples into cider and distilled the brandy in large vats. The brandy would age in barrels in a government warehouse that was located on the Cottrells' property. The Cottrells produced apple brandy for twenty years on the farm and sold it wholesale to distributors under the name Browntown.

Government

Local government 
Old Bridge Township is governed within the Faulkner Act, formally known as the Optional Municipal Charter Law, under the Mayor-Council system of municipal government. The township is one of 71 municipalities (of the 564) statewide governed under this form. The Township Council is comprised of nine members, with six elected to represent wards and three elected at-large from the township as a whole in partisan elections held as part of the November general election in odd-numbered years. All elected officials serve four-year terms of office on a staggered basis, with the six ward seats up for election together and the three at-large seats and the mayoral seat up for vote together two years later.

, the Mayor of Old Bridge Township is Republican Owen Henry, whose term of office ends December 31, 2023. The members of the Township Council are Council President Mary Rita Sohor (R, 2023; Ward 2), Council Vice-President Eleanor "Debbie" Walker (R, 2023; At-Large), Jill DeCaro (D, 2025), Erik DePalma (R, 2025; Ward 2), Kiran Desai (D, 2025; Ward 3), Kevin J. Garcia (R, 2025; Ward 1), Dr. Anita Greenberg-Belli (R, 2023; At-Large), John E. Murphy III (R, 2025; Ward 6), Anthony Paskitti (R, 2025; Ward 5).

Republican Mark Razzoli had been behind Democrat Jill DeCaro by 11 votes at the November 2021 general election for the seat in Ward 4. In December 2021, the results were invalidated after it was confirmed that dozens of residents had received incorrect ballots that had voters casting ballots in the incorrect ward. In a March 2022 special election, DeCaro was elected over Razzoli by an 838 to 693 margin.

In January 2020, the Township Council selected Erik DePalma from a list of three candidates nominated by the Republican municipal committee to fill the Second Ward seat expiring in December 2021 that became vacant when Mary Sohor resigned to take office after taking office to an at-large seat.

In June 2016, the Township Council appointed June Dungee to fill the vacant Third Ward seat expiring in December 2017 that had been held by Reginald Butler until his death earlier that month; Dungee served until the November 2016 general election, when voters choose a candidate to serve the balance of the term of office.

Federal, state and county representation 
Old Bridge Township is split between the 6th and 12th Congressional Districts and is part of New Jersey's 12th state legislative district. Prior to the 2011 reapportionment following the 2010 Census, Old Bridge Township had been in the 13th state legislative district. Prior to the 2010 Census, Old Bridge Township had also been split between the 6th and 12th Congressional Districts, though with different boundaries, a change made by the New Jersey Redistricting Commission that took effect in January 2013, based on the results of the November 2012 general elections. The split that took effect in 2013 placed 22,050 residents in the township's northern and eastern portions in the 6th District, while 43,325 residents in the western and southern area of the township were placed in the 12th District.

  

Middlesex County is governed by a Board of County Commissioners, whose seven members are elected at-large on a partisan basis to serve three-year terms of office on a staggered basis, with either two or three seats coming up for election each year as part of the November general election. At an annual reorganization meeting held in January, the board selects from among its members a commissioner director and deputy director. , Middlesex County's Commissioners (with party affiliation, term-end year, and residence listed in parentheses) are 
Commissioner Director Ronald G. Rios (D, Carteret, term as commissioner ends December 31, 2024; term as commissioner director ends 2022),
Commissioner Deputy Director Shanti Narra (D, North Brunswick, term as commissioner ends 2024; term as deputy director ends 2022),
Claribel A. "Clary" Azcona-Barber (D, New Brunswick, 2022),
Charles Kenny (D, Woodbridge Township, 2022),
Leslie Koppel (D, Monroe Township, 2023),
Chanelle Scott McCullum (D, Piscataway, 2024) and 
Charles E. Tomaro (D, Edison, 2023).
Constitutional officers are
County Clerk Nancy Pinkin (D, 2025, East Brunswick),
Sheriff Mildred S. Scott (D, 2022, Piscataway) and 
Surrogate Claribel Cortes (D, 2026; North Brunswick).

Politics

As of March 2011, there were a total of 38,907 registered voters in Old Bridge Township, of which 10,946 (28.1%) were registered as Democrats, 6,363 (16.4%) were registered as Republicans and 21,577 (55.5%) were registered as Unaffiliated. There were 21 voters registered to other parties.

In the 2012 presidential election, Democrat Barack Obama received 54.1% of the vote (13,127 cast), ahead of Republican Mitt Romney with 44.9% (10,911 votes), and other candidates with 1.0% (240 votes), among the 24,402 ballots cast by the township's 39,947 registered voters (124 ballots were spoiled), for a turnout of 61.1%. In the 2008 presidential election, Democrat Barack Obama received 51.0% of the vote (14,001 cast), ahead of Republican John McCain with 47.4% (13,019 votes) and other candidates with 1.0% (274 votes), among the 27,464 ballots cast by the township's 39,454 registered voters, for a turnout of 69.6%. In the 2004 presidential election, Republican George W. Bush received 51.0% of the vote (12,722 ballots cast), outpolling Democrat John Kerry with 47.7% (11,884 votes) and other candidates with 0.7% (237 votes), among the 24,931 ballots cast by the township's 36,428 registered voters, for a turnout percentage of 68.4.

In the 2013 gubernatorial election, Republican Chris Christie received 68.3% of the vote (10,211 cast), ahead of Democrat Barbara Buono with 30.3% (4,532 votes), and other candidates with 1.4% (206 votes), among the 15,147 ballots cast by the township's 40,437 registered voters (198 ballots were spoiled), for a turnout of 37.5%. In the 2009 gubernatorial election, Republican Chris Christie received 57.8% of the vote (9,511 ballots cast), ahead of Democrat Jon Corzine with 35.9% (5,898 votes), Independent Chris Daggett with 5.9% (976 votes) and other candidates with 1.0% (168 votes), among the 16,444 ballots cast by the township's 38,430 registered voters, yielding a 42.8% turnout.

Education
The Old Bridge Township Public Schools serve students in kindergarten through twelfth grade. As of the 2020–21 school year, the district, comprised of 14 schools, had an enrollment of 8,058 students and 680.10 classroom teachers (on an FTE basis), for a student–teacher ratio of 11.85:1. In 2019, Cheesequake Elementary School closed due to the state's reduction of school funding.   Schools in the district (with 2020–21 enrollment data from the National Center for Education Statistics) are 
M. Scott Carpenter Elementary School (250; K–5), 
Leroy Gordon Cooper Elementary School (196; K–5), 
Virgil I. Grissom Elementary School (183; K–5), 
Madison Park Elementary School (278; K–5), 
James A. McDivitt Elementary School (514; K–5), 
Memorial Elementary School (416; K–5), 
William A. Miller Elementary School (273; K–5), 
Walter M. Schirra Elementary School (253; K–5), 
Alan B. Shepard Elementary School (273; K–5), 
Southwood Elementary School (385; K–5), 
Raymond E. Voorhees Elementary School (387; K–5), 
Jonas Salk Middle School (896; 6–8) and 
Carl Sandburg Middle School (981; 6–8) and 
Old Bridge High School (2,714; 9–12).

Eighth grade students from all of Middlesex County are eligible to apply to attend the high school programs offered by the Middlesex County Vocational and Technical Schools, a county-wide vocational school district that offers full-time career and technical education at Middlesex County Academy in Edison, the Academy for Allied Health and Biomedical Sciences in Woodbridge Township and at its East Brunswick, Perth Amboy and Piscataway technical high schools, with no tuition charged to students for attendance.

Multiple private schools operate in the township. Calvary Christian School serves students in grades K–10, operating within Calvary Chapel Old Bridge. St. Ambrose School and St. Thomas the Apostle School are Pre-K–8 Catholic elementary schools that operate under the supervision of the Roman Catholic Diocese of Metuchen. St. Thomas the Apostle School was recognized in 2018 by the National Blue Ribbon Schools Program of the United States Department of Education.

Infrastructure

Transportation

Roads and highways

The township is crisscrossed by many major roads and highways.

Other routes, such as U.S. Route 9, Route 18, Route 34 and Route 35 also pass through the township. Major county routes that pass through are County Route 516, County Route 520, County Route 527 and County Route 615.

The New Jersey Turnpike (Interstate 95) is minutes north along Route 18 outside the township in bordering East Brunswick (Exit 9) and not too far also in bordering Monroe Township (Exit 8A).

Public transportation

Busing
For busing, Old Bridge Park and Ride is located along Route 9 northbound, close to Ernston Road.

Rail
Old Bridge borders Matawan on Route 34, and the Aberdeen-Matawan train station, and it also borders South Amboy on U.S. Route 9, and the South Amboy train station, both located along the North Jersey Coast Line. Old Bridge is also close to the New Brunswick train station in nearby New Brunswick and Metropark in nearby Iselin on the Northeast Corridor Line. 

NJ Transit Bus Operations provides bus service to communities along US Route 9 from Lakewood Township to Old Bridge Township, via bus routes 131, 133, 134, 135, 138, and 139 to the Port Authority Bus Terminal in Midtown Manhattan, service to Newark on the 67, on the 68 to Jersey City and local service on the 817 and 818 routes. Bus service is available from Route 9 to Wall Street in New York's Financial District via the  Academy Bus Line.

Middlesex County Area Transit (MCAT) shuttles provide service on routes operating across the county, including the M3 route, which operates between Brunswick Square and Old Bridge Township and the M7 route between Brunswick Square and South Amboy.

Aviation

Healthcare
Raritan Bay Medical Center has two hospitals in the area, the Old Bridge division and the Perth Amboy division. The Old Bridge Division, which handles all but trauma cases is located at the intersection of, Route 18 and Ferry Road. 

Other regional hospitals near the township that handle all but trauma cases include CentraState Medical Center in nearby Freehold and Bayshore Medical Center in nearby Holmdel. Most trauma cases are handled by Robert Wood Johnson University Hospital in nearby New Brunswick.

Old Bridge also has many long-term care facilities and nursing homes.

Emergency services

Police department
Old Bridge maintains a full-time police department consisting of 90 sworn personnel divided into multiple bureaus. The police department handles approximately 50,000 to 55,000 calls for service each year.
Administration Bureau: Chief of Police. Police radio, computer, 9-1-1, and dispatch operations. Training, scheduling etc.
Patrol Bureau: First responders for calls of service, motor vehicle crash investigators, motor vehicle and criminal law enforcement, road construction, special operations.
Traffic Safety Bureau: All traffic enforcement, road construction planning, commuter lot parking enforcement, state funded grants (i.e.:seatbelt enforcement, mobile phone enforcement, child seat, pedestrian etc.) serious and fatal motor vehicle crash investigations, large scale lane closings for events or crashes, road striping, traffic sign replacement and repair, ATV details, special events. Security of impounded vehicles.
Detective Bureau: Investigates all serious offenses and crimes, serious and fatal motor vehicle crash investigations, plain clothes operations. Works closely with FBI, United States Secret Service, Alcoholic Beverage Control and other federal agencies.
Identification Bureau: Works in conjunction with the detective bureau, documents all serious crime scenes, photography for crime scenes and fatal/serious motor vehicle crashes, fingerprinting, evidence collection, processing and storing, civilian background checks, Megans Law enforcement, firearms application investigating and processing.
Narcotics Bureau: All drug- and alcohol-related investigations, undercover operations, surveillance, liaisons with Prosecutors office, special operations, raids. Keeps a close relationship with the DEA.
Fire Arms Unit: Officers trained in qualifying and training all police personnel in weapons systems. This unit repairs and maintains firearms, gear and schedules all state mandated firearms training for the officers. Orders ammunition and supplies related to officer gear.
Special Operations: Department of Homeland Security liaisons, Laurence Harbor and Cliffwood Beach boardwalk and beachfront details, anti-terrorism and counter-terrorism training, covert operations.
Police Garage: Mechanics trained in police vehicle repair, wiring, maintenance, storage of impounded vehicles.
Auxiliary Police: Patrol in marked cars and uniform. They augment the regular officers while on patrol. Auxiliary officers provide additional security for events and details, parade traffic assistance, township fairs, carnivals, benefit functions etc. These officers fall under the Office of Emergency Management section of the township and are all volunteers, receiving no paychecks for their services.
Special police officers: Most of these "special" employees are classified as Class I officers.  They provide security at parks and recreation areas, conduct crowd control and are frequently used on court days to handle prisoners. They also serve as another set of eyes and ears for the patrol bureau. Class II officers are also employed in the township.  Class II Police Officers are armed and hold the same powers as officers within the patrol bureau while they are on duty.

Fire departments
Old Bridge is divided into four fire districts:

Fire District 1: Laurence Harbor Fire Department, established in 1924 and operating out of two stations.
Fire District 2: Cheesequake Volunteer Fire Company, with Station 1 at 113 Route 34, Station 2 at 4290 Route 516 and Station 3 at 3080 Route 516.
Fire District 3: South Old Bridge Volunteer Fire Company, established in 1947 and operating out of three stations, with Engine Company 1 located at 958 Englishtown Road, Engine Company 2 at 14 Throckmorton Lane and Engine Company 3 at 1599 Englishtown Road.
Fire District 4: Madison Park Volunteer Fire Company, organized in 1956.

Each of the above have several different fire houses with adequate equipment and trucks to handle any and all situations that arise within the township or surrounding towns.
Old Bridge is equipped for:
HAZMAT
Tower rescue
Water rescue/ice rescue
Heavy Duty rescue
General search and rescue
Wildland firefighting
Trench rescue

Medical/first aid services

Old Bridge is divided into five districts each with a volunteer first aid squad. Numerous ambulances are in service for the community.  A paid squad is employed between the hours of 6am to 6pm.
Cheesequake Volunteer First Aid Squad, formed in 1969
Laurence Harbor Volunteer First Aid Squad, established in 1927 and serving the areas of Laurence Harbor, Cliffwood Beach, Genoa, Cheesequake State Park, Cheesequake Village and Ellen Heath
Madison Park Volunteer First Aid Squad, formed in 1959
Old Bridge First Aid and Rescue Squad (nicknamed "Red & White" due to the color of their ambulances)
Old Bridge Volunteer Emergency Medical Services (nicknamed "Green & White" due to the color of their ambulances)

Old Bridge Township Emergency Medical Services (OBTEMS) is the municipal paid service which covers daytime hours 6am–6pm.

Advanced Life Support (ALS), also known as medics, are paid personnel dispatched to all township calls based on the requirements of assistance. Medics respond to all life/death situations due to a traumatic injury, industrial accident, heart problems, strokes, serious vehicle crashes, etc.  The medics are housed by Robert Wood Johnson University Hospital, Saint Peter's University Hospital and Raritan Bay Medical Center. Each are assigned their own ambulance.

Township attractions

 Laurence Harbor Beachfront offers  on the Raritan Bay waterfront, with beaches, playgrounds and fishing available, in addition to a boardwalk and walkways at Paul's Beach stretching .
 John Piccolo Arena
 Old Bridge Airport
 Old Bridge Township Raceway Park operated from 1965 to 2018 for drag racing, after which its owners planned to turn it into space for outdoor concerts.
 Township parks include Veterans Park and Geick Park

Community and historical information

CPS Madison Industries Superfund Site has been identified as the 14th-worst Superfund site in the United States.  That area is fenced off along Waterworks Road, near Cheesequake Road. This area has one chemical plant still operating, Old Bridge Chemical. A former plant, Ciba Chemical closed several years ago and a bulk of the plant was demolished, only the office building remains.
Many small ponds in the area are remnants of clay pits dug in the 19th century, as clay was a major industry. The Perrine clay pit was located near Route 9 and Ernston Road.
The Runyon coal yards were located off Bordentown Avenue and Cheesequake Road, where Stavola Asphalt Construction Company (formerly Manzos Contracting) currently operates. Rail cars at this yard were used to transport their loads to the South Amboy docks, where the coal was shipped to New York City.
Pilings of former docks can be found by foot traversing Steamboat Landing Road, also known as Dock Road, which is the extension of Cottrell Road at its intersection with Route 34.
The Ochwald Brickworks, now the site of Bridgepointe Development in Laurence Harbor, began operation in 1910 and continued operation into the early 1960s. Behind the Bridgepointe Development and far into the woodline and field, old bricks can still be found.
The Kepec Chemical Company in the Genoa section (off County Road) is where Julius and Ethel Rosenberg were reported to have contacted Russian spies in 1950. The FBI conducted surveillance of the building at the corner of Biondi Avenue and Gordon Street. Only a few bricks remain to mark this location at the foot of Columbus Avenue.
A mass grave in the Ernst Memorial Cemetery off Ernston Road holds the remains of over a dozen unidentified victims of the T. A. Gillespie Company Shell Loading Plant explosion of 1918. This plant exploded in the Morgan section of neighboring Sayreville, killing an estimated 100 persons. Shock waves were felt as far north as Newark.
A horse-racing track used to be located where present day Lakeridge development now stands (near the border with Matawan Borough.)
A circular car racing track (early 1950s to approximately 1982) used to be located off County Route 516 where the Whispering Pines Development is now. No visible trace remains.
Located near the Garden State Parkway exit 120, Route 34 and Route 35, the park is often crowded by sunbathers, picnics, concert goers (nearby PNC Bank Arts Center) and tourists.
A Cold War-era Nike missile base is located off U.S. Route 9 on Jake Brown Road. Listed in Weird NJ as a haunted site, readers frequent this area and explore the fields where former base worker residences once stood. The actual base was purchased by Old Bridge Township Board of Education and is currently used to store their own supplies and vehicles. The former underground silos and tunnels were purposely flooded and caved in when the base was closed.
Old Bridge Township Raceway Park, a racetrack that had hosted Funny Car and drag racing including the NHRA Summernationals, is located off Route 527 (Englishtown Road) near the township's border with Manalapan and Monroe. As part of a January 2018 reorganization, the facility announced that it will no longer be holding drag racing events, retaining kart and motocross races, as well as car shows and concerts.
On September 3, 1977, the Grateful Dead performed for a crowd of 100,000 at Raceway Park. The show was recorded and released in album form as part of "Dick's Picks", a series of live albums, in 1999.
The heavy metal band Metallica relocated from Los Angeles to the township in the early 1980s to record the songs on what would be their debut album Kill 'Em All.

Notable people

People who were born in, residents of, or otherwise closely associated with Old Bridge Township include:

 Brandon Allen (born 1993), professional soccer player for the New York Red Bulls
 R. J. Allen (born 1990), professional soccer player for New York City FC
 Josh Ansley, bass player for Streetlight Manifesto and Catch 22
 Andrew Brooks (1969–2021), associate research professor at Rutgers University and immunologist, who was the developer of the first FDA-approved rapid saliva test for COVID-19 diagnosis
 Adam Chazen (born 1985/86), special effects producer, best known for his work on the cable television series Game of Thrones, for which he has received five Emmy Awards
 Louis Consalvo (born 1958), reputed soldier in the DeCavalcante crime family
 Quinton Crawford (born 1990), assistant coach for the Los Angeles Lakers of the NBA
 Junot Diaz (born 1968), Pulitzer Prize-winning novelist
 Doug Emhoff (born 1964), lawyer and the husband of Vice President Kamala Harris
 Colleen Fitzpatrick (born 1972), a pop music artist, dancer and actress, better known by her stage name, Vitamin C
 Minkah Fitzpatrick (born 1996), American football defensive back for the Pittsburgh Steelers
 Laurie Hernandez (born 2000), artistic gymnast representing Team USA at the 2016 Summer Olympics. Gold medalist in the team competition
 Phil Ivey (born 1977), professional poker player
 Franklin Lawson, retired soccer player who played professionally in the American Soccer League and the United Soccer League
 Caren Lissner (born 1972), novelist
 Fabian Nicieza (born 1961), comic book writer and editor who is best known for his work on Marvel titles such as X-Men, X-Force, New Warriors, Cable & Deadpool and Thunderbolts.
 Brian O'Halloran (born 1969), actor. Appeared in Clerks and Clerks 2
 Jodi Lyn O'Keefe (born 1978), actress
 Tab Ramos (born 1966), retired soccer midfielder
 George Rizzi (born 1951), guitarist and musical director of the 1960s pop/rock group The Happenings, whose hits include "See You In September" and "Go Away Little Girl"
 Michael Rotkowitz (born 1974), applied mathematician best known for his work in decentralized control theory
 Diane Ruggiero, screenwriter for Veronica Mars
 Ed Sanicki (1923–1998), outfielder who played for the Philadelphia Phillies
 Donna Simpson (born 1967), Guinness World Record holder for largest mother
 Joann H. Smith (1934–1998), politician who served in the New Jersey General Assembly from the 13th Legislative District from 1986 to 1998
 Shannon Sohn (born 1974), first helicopter reporter to earn a national Emmy Award
 William H. Sutphin (1887–1972) represented  from 1931 to 1943

References

External links

Old Bridge Township Public Schools

School Data for the Old Bridge Township Public Schools, National Center for Education Statistics
Liberty Grove Memorial Mausoleum & Crematory – Old Bridge, NJ

 
1869 establishments in New Jersey
Faulkner Act (mayor–council)
Populated places established in 1869
Townships in Middlesex County, New Jersey
Jersey Shore communities in Middlesex County